Sylwester Braun (code-name "Kris", 1 January 1909, Warsaw – 2 February 1996, Warsaw) was a Polish photographer, Home Army officer. He is known as the author of photography evidencing the Nazi Occupation of Poland and the Warsaw Uprising.

Braun was born on 1 January 1909 in Warsaw. During the Warsaw Uprising he took 3000 photographs of battles, people, destruction, and everyday life in the fighting city. Generally he operated in the Śródmieście district. After the capitulation of Warsaw, he escaped from the city, returning in January 1945 to retrieve his negatives. After that he fled to Sweden, and in 1964 he immigrated to the United States. In 1981 he delivered archives of his photographs to the Historical Museum of Warsaw. Sylwester Braun died in Warsaw on the 2nd of February, 1996.

See also

Bureau of Information and Propaganda of Armia Krajowa

External links

 Gallery of his photographs (pol)
 Stories Behind the Photographs (en)

1909 births
1996 deaths
Photographers from Warsaw
Home Army members
Polish emigrants to the United States
Warsaw Uprising insurgents
Commanders of the Order of Merit of the Republic of Poland